Ina Justh (born 19 December 1969) is a German rower. She competed in the women's eight event at the 1996 Summer Olympics.

References

External links
 

1969 births
Living people
German female rowers
Olympic rowers of Germany
Rowers at the 1996 Summer Olympics
Sportspeople from Saxony
World Rowing Championships medalists for East Germany
21st-century German women
20th-century German women